Gaun Gaun Bata Utha is a Nepali-language revolutionary song by music duo Raamesh and Rayan and written and composed by Shyam Tamot. The song is also known as Sankalpa (resolution/ vow) song. The song has been translated into 17 national and foreign languages including Chinese, French and Hindi. The song served as an anthem during the 1979 Nepalese student protests as well as many other protests in Nepal.

Background 

In 1978, Shyam Tamot composed "Gaun Gaun Bata Utha" with vocals by musical duo Ramesh and Rayan.

Lyrics

In popular culture 
 The original song is featured prominently in Tulsi Ghimire's Balidaan (1997), historical drama film about a fictionalised version of the contemporary democracy movement.
 Nepali folk rock band Nepathya released a cover version of the song in 2018.

References 

1978 songs
Nepalese film songs
Nepalese songs
Works about the Nepalese Civil War
Nepali-language songs